Lock Island is an island in the River Thames in England connected to Shepperton Lock, near Shepperton. Facing the attached by lock-gate bridge mainland is a hedge-lined lawn hosting a café, below and above zones of free short-stay moorings. The Thames River Police have a station on the island. Shepperton Canoe Club and Weybridge Mariners' Boat Club face part of the Weybridge side. The island is connected to Hamhaugh Island by a walkway across the main weir, in turn having a closed-access weir to Hamm Court, Addlestone.

History
Lock Island was uninhabited until the late 19th century, when some people from London moved there due to the unhealthy environment of the city. During the Blitz, a few families moved to the island and stayed there, with their descendants living in the few homes (all in the east of the island) such as Lock House.

Environment
The west of the island is undisturbed wilderness, and is home to a population of European water voles.

A little of the island has been a boat store, given permission in 1982.

See also
Islands in the River Thames

References

Islands of the River Thames
Borough of Spelthorne